Petrus Oellibrandt (1 December 1935 – 15 June 2014) was a Belgian racing cyclist. He won the Belgian national road race title in 1959.

References

External links

1935 births
2014 deaths
Belgian male cyclists
People from Beveren
Cyclists from East Flanders
20th-century Belgian people